Manfred Fabi (born c. 1953) is an Austrian male curler.

At the national level, he is a 1983 Austrian men's champion curler.

His father Arthur was the skip of his team.

Teams

References

External links

Austrian male curlers
Austrian curling champions
1950s births
Place of birth missing (living people)